Methyldienolone (developmental code name RU-3467), also known as 17α-methyl-19-nor-δ9-testosterone, as well as 17α-methylestra-4,9-dien-17β-ol-3-one, is a synthetic, orally active anabolic-androgenic steroid (AAS) and a 17α-alkylated derivative of 19-nortestosterone. It is closely related to dienolone and ethyldienolone.

Methyldienolone is on the World Anti-Doping Agency's list of prohibited substances, and is therefore banned from use in most major sports.

See also
 Dienedione
 Metribolone

References

Androgens and anabolic steroids
Dienes
Estranes
Hepatotoxins
World Anti-Doping Agency prohibited substances